Mary Cennamo Robison  (born January 14, 1949 in Washington, D.C., United States) is an American short story writer and novelist. She has published four collections of stories, and four novels, including her 2001  novel Why Did I Ever, winner of the 2001 Los Angeles Times Book Prize for fiction. Her most recent novel, released in 2009, is One D.O.A., One on the Way.  She has been categorized as a founding "minimalist" writer along with authors such as Amy Hempel, Frederick Barthelme, and Raymond Carver. In 2009, she won the Rea Award for the Short Story.

Life
Robison was born to patent attorney Anthony Cennamo and F. Elizabeth (Cennamo) Reiss, a child psychologist.  She has seven brothers and sisters as well as a half brother. She was born in Washington D.C. and grew up in Columbus, Ohio. From an early age she was interested in writing and as a child kept journals and wrote poetry as a teenager. She once ran away from home and journeyed to Florida in search of Jack Kerouac.
She attended Ohio State University for college.  Robison received her MA from Johns Hopkins University, where she studied with John Barth. She has taught at numerous colleges and universities, including Oberlin, Ohio University and Harvard and is now a tenured professor at the University of Florida.

In 1977 The New Yorker began publishing her work, with the short story "Sisters." They have since published two dozen stories, many of which reappear in American anthologies. During the 1980s she published the novel Oh! which was made into a film by Paramount called Twister and starred Harry Dean Stanton. Her other early work includes the short story collections An Amateur's Guide to the Night (1983) and Believe Them (1988).

In the 1990s she suffered from severe writer's block and in an effort to overcome it she scribbled her thoughts on thousands of index cards.  These cards were reworked to become the novel Why Did I Ever, which consists of 536 short chapters.

Her novel One DOA, One on the Way was chosen by Oprah Winfrey's Book Club for 2009 summer time reading.

Robison has been married twice. Her second husband was author James Robison, whom she divorced in 1996. She has two daughters by her first husband.

Selected works

Oh! Knopf, 1981
An Amateur's Guide to the Night: Stories Knopf, 1983, 
Believe Them: Stories Knopf, 1988, 
Subtraction, Knopf, 1991, 
; reprint Counterpoint Press, 2002, 
Tell Me: 30 Stories Counterpoint Press, 2002, 
One D.O.A., one on the way: a novel, Counterpoint, 2009,

References

External links
 "Mary Robison", Maureen Murray, BOMB 77, Fall 2001
 Keillor, Garrison. Writer's Almanac. January 14, 2011.
 "Preview: The World of Fiction - Mary Robison", Prentice Hall

20th-century American novelists
21st-century American novelists
American women novelists
American women short story writers
Minimalist writers
Writers from Washington, D.C.
Writers from Columbus, Ohio
Ohio State University alumni
University of Houston faculty
1949 births
Living people
University of Florida faculty
Johns Hopkins University alumni
20th-century American women writers
21st-century American women writers
20th-century American short story writers
21st-century American short story writers
Novelists from Texas
Novelists from Ohio
Novelists from Florida
American women academics